The Bourke Award of the Royal Society of Chemistry is an annual prize open to academics from outside the UK. Originally established by the Faraday Society and known as the Bourke Lectures, the award of £2000 enables experts in physical chemistry or chemical physics to present their work in the UK. The winner also receives a commemorative medal.

Winners
Source:

See also

 List of chemistry awards

References

Awards of the Royal Society of Chemistry